Ahmed Sadequr (born 20 December 1987) is a Bangladeshi first-class cricketer who plays for Sylhet Division.

See also
 List of Sylhet Division cricketers

References

External links
 

1987 births
Living people
Bangladeshi cricketers
Sylhet Division cricketers
People from Sylhet